Darina is South Slavic feminine given name. It is common in Bulgarian, Czech, Slovak, Slovenian and Ukrainian cultures and comes from the root Slavic element "dar" which means gift. There is evidence that it originally comes from the name Darius, which originally in Persian meant "one who possesses the good" or "precious"/"valuable".

Notable People
 Darina Al Joundi, Lebanese-born French stage actor
 Darina Allen, Irish cook
 Darina Mifkova, volleyball player representing Italy
 Dara Rolins, Slovak singer
 Darina Yotova, Bulgarian pop singer
 Darina Takova, Bulgarian opera singer
 Daryna Apanashchenko, Ukrainian soccer player
 Daryna Kyrychenko, Ukrainian snowboarder and Youth Olympic Bronze Medalist
 Daryna Polotniuk, 20th century Ukrainian writer
 Daryna Verkhohliad, Ukrainian rower
 Daryna Zevina, Ukrainian swimmer
 Daryna Zgoba, Ukrainian artistic gymnast
 Darina, Mexican singer

Persian feminine given names
Slovak feminine given names
Czech feminine given names
Bulgarian feminine given names
Slovene feminine given names
Ukrainian feminine given names